The England and Wales Precipitation (EWP) record is a historical meteorological dataset which was originally published in the journal British Rainfall in 1931 and updated in a greatly revised form by a number of climatologists including Janice Lough, Tom Wigley and Phil Jones during the 1970s and 1980s. The monthly mean rainfall and snowfall for the region of England and Wales are given (in millimetres) from the year 1766 to the present, though the original 1931 dataset went as far back as 1727.

Data quality
The England and Wales Precipitation series for its earlier years was based on the work of amateur observers whose observations were collected by George James Symons in British Rainfall and analysed extensively in 1931 to form a monthly series as far back as 1727. Detailed analysis during the early 1980s showed by use of principal component analysis that England and Wales could be climatologically divided into five regions corresponding closely to present-day meteorological divisions; however, because of the absence of data from South West England between 1813 and 1816 and from North West England before 1766, the modern series begins in January 1766. Separate data for each region of England go back only to 1873.

Recent analysis suggests that the sparse data (besides the absence of data from South West England for four years, only one station was used per region until the 1820s) from early years can lead to bias towards drier conditions since higher and wetter areas are not likely to be accounted for, though no effort has yet been made to examine the data. There has also been a suggestion that many of the very earliest values, before circa 1780 and for a few years near 1800 and between 1809 and 1813, are rather too low compared to other estimates from A.F. Jenkinson of the University of East Anglia.

Trends revealed by the series
Research into the EWP series since it was compiled have revealed that, overall, annual rainfall has not changed significantly despite some suggestions of a rising trend, but that winter half-year rainfall has substantially increased especially in the more northerly areas of England. Up to 2000, summer rainfall, especially in July and August, over the southern parts of England, showed a substantial decline; however, the very wet summers of 2007 and 2012 may suggest this is not a permanent change. Nonetheless, it is known that the maximum in rainfall during autumn (typical of high latitude maritime climates) has moved towards a later date since the 1960s, especially compared to the 1890s.

Extrema
Taking the 247-year period for the series as a whole:

Wettest

Driest

 The driest consecutive months were March and April 1938 with just  in total.
 The driest three consecutive months were January to March 1779 with only  in total.
 The driest four consecutive months were February to May 1785 with only ; no other non-overlapping period has under .
The only other non-overlapping twelve-month period drier than the record dry calendar year of 1788 was from February 1854 to January 1855 when  was registered, whilst November 1780 to October 1781 recorded only .

References

See also
Climate of the United Kingdom
Central England Temperature

Climate of England
Climate of Wales